The Winter Quarters Nebraska Temple is the 104th operating temple of the Church of Jesus Christ of Latter-day Saints (LDS Church). It is located in Florence, now a neighborhood of Omaha, Nebraska, USA, and formerly an independent city.

History
Winter Quarters is considered hallowed ground for the members of the LDS Church. It was the site where early church members settled after they were driven out of Nauvoo, Illinois. It was also where many Latter-day Saints, including many who came from Europe, camped before crossing the plains to the Salt Lake Valley. The area has many graves of Mormon pioneers who died on their journey. More than 2,000 church members died at Winter Quarters because of heavy storms, scurvy, malaria and inadequate food and shelter.

The new temple was built next to the Mormon Pioneer Cemetery and Mormon Trail Center. During the groundbreaking ceremony, conducted by Truman F. Clawson on November 28, 1999, he said, "Now today on this end of the hill, we will take shovels in our hands to dig not a grave but the foundation of a special building, a temple."

In preparation for the open house, church members and the community of Florence worked together creating handcrafted flowers for storefronts and decorating historic sites and markers with balloons. Over 61,000 visitors toured the Winter Quarters Temple during its open house, which ran from March 30 to April 14, 2001.

Members all over the United States and Canada watched via satellite broadcast as LDS Church president Gordon B. Hinckley dedicated the Winter Quarters Nebraska Temple on April 22, 2001. During the dedicatory prayer, Hinckley recognized the sacrifice of the Saints and the great spiritual and historical significance of having a temple at Winter Quarters.

The Winter Quarters Nebraska Temple has a total area of 16,000 square feet (1,500 m2), two ordinance rooms, and two sealing rooms.

At one time, the church intended to name the temple Winter Quarters Temple in contradiction to the standard naming convention for church temples.

In 2020, like all the church's other temples, the Winter Quarters Nebraska Temple was closed due to the COVID-19 pandemic.

See also

 Theodore H. Okiishi, temple president (2013–)
 Comparison of temples of The Church of Jesus Christ of Latter-day Saints
 List of temples of The Church of Jesus Christ of Latter-day Saints
 List of temples of The Church of Jesus Christ of Latter-day Saints by geographic region
 Temple architecture
 List of churches in Omaha, Nebraska
 The Church of Jesus Christ of Latter-day Saints in Nebraska

References

External links
 Official Winter Quarters Nebraska Temple page
 Winter Quarters Nebraska Temple at ChurchofJesusChristTemples.org

2001 establishments in Nebraska
21st-century Latter Day Saint temples
Landmarks in North Omaha, Nebraska
Latter Day Saint movement in Nebraska
Religious buildings and structures in Omaha, Nebraska
Temples (LDS Church) completed in 2001
Temples (LDS Church) in the United States